Josephine Dawn Adès,  (née Tylden-Pattenson; born 6 May 1943), also known as Dawn Adès, is a British art historian and academic. She is professor emeritus of art history and theory at the University of Essex.

Early life and education
Adès was born on 6 May 1943 to A. E. Tylden-Pattenson. She studied at St Hilda's College, Oxford, graduating with a Bachelor of Arts (BA) degree in 1965. She then studied art history at the Courtauld Institute of Art, graduating with a Master of Arts (MA) degree in 1968.

Career
Adès has spent the majority of her academic career working at the University of Essex. She was a lecturer from 1971 to 1985, a senior lecturer from 1985 to 1988, and a Reader from 1988 to 1989. She was appointed Professor of Art History and Theory in 1989, and served as head of Department of Art History and Theory between 1989 and 1992. She has since been appointed professor emeritus. For the 2009/2010 academic year, she was the Slade Professor of the History of Art at the University of Oxford: the lecture series she gave was titled "Surrealism and the avant-garde in Europe and the Americas".

Adès was a trustee of the Tate Gallery from 1995 to 2005, of the National Gallery from 1998 to 2005, and of the Henry Moore Foundation from 2003 to 2013. She was a member of the council of the British Academy from 1999 to 2002. Since 2008, she has held the honorary title of Professor of the History of Art at the Royal Academy of Arts.

Personal life
In 1966, the then Dawn Tylden-Pattenson married the British poet and translator Timothy Adès. Together they have three sons, one of whom is the composer, pianist and conductor Thomas Adès.

Honours
In 1996, Adès was elected a Fellow of the British Academy (FBA), the United Kingdom's national academy for the humanities and the social sciences. She gave the 1995 Aspects of Art Lecture. In the 2002 Queen's Birthday Honours, she was appointed an Officer of the Order of the British Empire (OBE) "for services to art history". In the 2013 New Year Honours, she was promoted to Commander of the Order of the British Empire (CBE) "for services to higher education and art history".

Selected works
  
  
 
  (with Guy Brett)
 
 
 
  (co-editor Simon Baker)
 
  (co-editor William Jeffett)

References

1943 births
British art critics
British art historians
Women art historians
Living people
British women historians
Alumni of St Hilda's College, Oxford
Commanders of the Order of the British Empire
Fellows of the British Academy
Alumni of the Courtauld Institute of Art
20th-century British historians
20th-century British women writers
21st-century British historians
21st-century British women writers